The 2020 WSBL season was to be the 32nd season of the Women's State Basketball League (SBL). The regular season was set to begin on Friday 20 March, but due to the coronavirus pandemic, the season was cancelled.

Season that was scheduled
Following a pre-season blitz weekend, the regular season was set to begin on Friday 20 March. Round 1 (13–15 March) was scheduled as a bye round for the WSBL (inline with the MSBL having a small-scale opening round), with all 12 teams making their season debuts in round 2 and playing 19 weekends of competition, concluding on Friday 24 July. In continuing tradition, there was to be Easter Round (5), Anzac Round (6), Women's Round (9), Heritage Round (13), and Mental Health Awareness Round (18). The finals was then scheduled to take place between Friday 31 July and Friday 21 August, concluding with the WSBL Grand Final. Under a revised finals model, the finals was to take place across four weekends instead of five to better align with the NBL1 format.

In the wake of the coronavirus outbreak in Australia in early to mid March 2020, the season was suspended indefinitely with no games having taken place. On 14 May 2020, the season was officially cancelled due to the ongoing pandemic.

West Coast Classic
To fill the void of a cancelled SBL season, a state amateur competition known as the West Coast Classic was announced on 12 June 2020. Presented by Basketball WA, all 12 Women's SBL teams competed in the 10-week competition. The competition began on Friday 24 July and had all teams playing each other once in a home and away fixture. The top four teams following the regular season competed in the finals, with semi-finals on Friday 25 September and the grand final on Saturday 26 September.

The Joondalup Wolves finished atop the regular-season standings with a 10–1 record. The semi-finals featured the Wolves against the fourth-seeded Rockingham Flames and the second-seeded Warwick Senators against the third-seeded Perry Lakes Hawks, with the Wolves defeating the Flames 101–48 and the Hawks defeating the Senators 95–70. In the grand final, the Wolves defeated the Hawks 72–54 behind 13 points and 12 rebounds from game MVP Kayla Steindl.

References

External links
 2020 fixtures
 Season preview
 Rockingham Flames 2020 season magazine
 2020 WCC Grand Final replay

2020
2019–20 in Australian basketball
2020–21 in Australian basketball